Zibo Cuju Football Club is a professional Chinese football club that currently participates in the China League One. The team is based in Zibo.

History
Zibo Sunday was founded in June 1982 inspired by the 1982 FIFA World Cup. As the founders of the team mainly played football together on Sunday, they used Sunday as the club's name. They officially registered as an amateur club on 18 July 1996. Zibo Sunday finished the third place in the 2011 AFC Vision China Championship and won qualification for the 2012 Chinese FA Cup, which they lost to China League Two club Dongguan Nancheng 3–0. On 30 September 2017, Zibo Sunday won promotion to China League Two after they advanced to semi-final of 2017 China Amateur Football League by beating Lhasa Urban Construction Investment 1–0, and eventually, winning the entire Championship by beating Anhui Hefei Guiguan in the final. After competing in 2018 China League Two and ending up in a mid-table finish, Zibo Sunday F.C. changed their name to Zibo Cuju F.C. in January 2019, stressing the significance of Zibo being the home of Cuju, a form of proto-football sport in ancient China.

Name history
 1982–2018 Zibo Sunday S.C.  淄博星期天
 2019–     Zibo Cuju F.C. 淄博蹴鞠

Players

Current squad

Coaching staff

Managerial history
  Liu Mengyang (2015)
  Zhang Chonglai (2016)
  Liu Meng (2017)
  Hou Zhiqiang (2018–2020)
  Park Chul (2021)
  Huang Hongyi (2021–)

Results
All-time league rankings

As of the end of 2019 season.

 Did not qualify to the final stage.  AFC Vision China Championship.  In group stage.  Zibo Cuju had 6 points deducted due to unpaid salaries on 23 November 2022.

Key
 Pld = Played
 W = Games won
 D = Games drawn
 L = Games lost
 F = Goals for
 A = Goals against
 Pts = Points
 Pos = Final position

 DNQ = Did not qualify
 DNE = Did not enter
 NH = Not Held
 – = Does Not Exist
 R1 = Round 1
 R2 = Round 2
 R3 = Round 3
 R4 = Round 4

 F = Final
 SF = Semi-finals
 QF = Quarter-finals
 R16 = Round of 16
 Group = Group stage
 GS2 = Second Group stage
 QR1 = First Qualifying Round
 QR2 = Second Qualifying Round
 QR3 = Third Qualifying Round

References

 
Football clubs in China
Association football clubs established in 1982
Sport in Shandong
Zibo
1982 establishments in China